Louis-Philippe Celestin (born August 30, 1994), better known by his stage name Lou Phelps, is a Haitian-Canadian rapper and producer from Saint-Hubert, Quebec. He is a member of the Canadian hip hop duo The Celestics alongside his brother Kaytranada.

Career

2011–14: Early career 
Lou Phelps began his career as Louie P. with The Celestics. They released their debut project titled Massively Massive in 2011.

2014-present: Supreme Laziness & 001: Experiments 
In 2014, Lou Phelps, along with Kaytranada, released a project titled Supreme Laziness under the moniker The Celestics.

On April 20, 2017, Lou Phelps released his debut project titled 001: Experiments. The project was produced entirely by Kaytranada. The project featured guest appearances by Bishop Nehru, Innanet James and Kallitechnis.

Influences 
Lou Phelps's influences include Andre 3000, Kendrick Lamar, Kanye West, Anderson .Paak and Madlib.

Discography

Solo 
 001: Experiments (2017)
 002: Love Me (2018)
 003: Extra Extra (2020)

Collaborations 
 Massively Massive (with Kaytranada as The Celestics) (2011)
 Supreme Laziness (with Kaytranada as The Celestics) (2014)

References 

Canadian male rappers
21st-century Canadian rappers
Living people
1994 births
Black Canadian musicians
People from Longueuil
21st-century Canadian male musicians
Canadian people of Haitian descent